Mordellistena longipalpis is a beetle in the genus Mordellistena of the family Mordellidae. It was described in 1891 by Carlo Emery. It is known from Tunis.

References

longipalpis
Beetles described in 1891